DNA polymerase beta, also known as POLB, is an enzyme present in eukaryotes. In humans, it is encoded by the POLB gene.

Function 
In eukaryotic cells, DNA polymerase beta (POLB) performs base excision repair (BER) required for DNA maintenance, replication, recombination, and drug resistance.

The mitochondrial DNA of mammalian cells is constantly under attack from oxygen radicals released during ATP production.  Mammalian cell mitochondria contain an efficient base excision repair system employing POLB that removes some frequent oxidative DNA damages.  POLB thus has a key role in maintaining the stability of the mitochondrial genome.

An analysis of the fidelity of DNA replication by polymerase beta in the neurons from young and very aged mice indicated that aging has no significant effect on the fidelity of DNA synthesis by polymerase beta.  This finding was considered to provide evidence against the error catastrophe theory of aging.

Base excision repair

Cabelof et al. measured the ability to repair DNA damage by the BER pathway in tissues of young (4-month-old) and old (24-month-old) mice.  In all tissues examined (brain, liver, spleen and testes) the ability to repair DNA damage declined significantly with age, and the reduction in repair capability correlated with decreased levels of DNA polymerase beta at both the protein and messenger RNA levels. Numerous investigators have reported an accumulation of DNA damage with age, especially in brain and liver. Cabelof et al. suggested that the inability of the BER pathway to repair damages over time may provide a mechanistic explanation for the frequent observations of DNA accumulation of damage with age.

Regulation of expression 
DNA polymerase beta maintains genome integrity by participating in base excision repair. Overexpression of POLB mRNA has been correlated with a number of cancer types, whereas deficiencies in POLB results in hypersensitivity to alkylating agents, induced apoptosis, and chromosomal breaking. Therefore, it is essential that POLB expression is tightly regulated.

POLB gene is upregulated by CREB1 transcription factor's binding to the cAMP response element (CRE) present in the promoter of the POLB gene in response to exposure to alkylating agents. POLB gene expression is also regulated at the post transcriptional level as the 3'UTR of the POLB mRNA has been shown to contain three stem-loop structures that influence gene expression. These three-stem loop structures are known as M1, M2, and M3, where M2 and M3 have a key role in gene regulation. M3 contributes to gene expression, as it contains the polyadenylation signal followed by the cleavage and polyadenylation site, thereby contributing to pre-mRNA processing. M2 has been shown to be evolutionary conserved, and, through mutagenesis, it was shown that this stem loop structure acts as a RNA destabilizing element.

In addition to these cis-regulatory elements present within the 3'UTR a trans-acting protein, HAX1 is thought to contribute to the regulation of gene expression. Yeast three-hybrid assays have shown that this protein binds to the stem loops within the 3'UTR of the POLB mRNA, however the exact mechanism in how this protein regulates gene expression is still to be determined.

Interactions 
DNA polymerase beta has been shown to interact with PNKP and XRCC1.

See also 
 POLA1
 POLA2

Model organisms 

Model organisms have been used in the study of POLB function. A conditional knockout mouse line called Polbtm1a(KOMP)Wtsi was generated at the Wellcome Trust Sanger Institute. Male and female animals underwent a standardized phenotypic screen to determine the effects of deletion. Additional screens performed: In-depth immunological phenotyping

References

Further reading

External links 
Rfam entry for the stem loopII (M2) regulatory element in POLB

DNA repair
DNA-binding proteins